The Santa Barbara shelled slug or slug snail, scientific name Binneya notabilis, is a species of air-breathing land slug, a shell-less terrestrial gastropod mollusk in the family Binneyidae.

Distribution
This species is found only in the United States.

References

Binneyidae
Molluscs of the United States
Taxonomy articles created by Polbot
Gastropods described in 1863